The U.S. state of Illinois has an active LGBT history, centered on its largest city Chicago, where by the 1920s a gay village had emerged in the Old Town district. Chicago was also the base for the short-lived Society for Human Rights, an early LGBT rights advocacy organization (1924).

In 1961 Illinois became the first U.S. state to decriminalize certain forms of homosexual activity. Gay and lesbian culture developed in Chicago thereafter, and the 2006 Gay Games were held in the city. Civil unions have been recognized in Illinois since 2014.

19th century
In 1827, Illinois became the first state to criminalize the act of fellatio, ruling it as an act of sodomy.

In 1862, Jennie Hodgers, an Irish immigrant to Illinois, enlisted in the 95th Illinois Infantry as Albert Cashier. As Cashier, he fought in numerous battles and survived the war, and enjoyed many privileges which were restricted from women for the next several decades until the near end of his life. He was buried with full military honors under his adopted name.

20th century

1900–1949
By 1920, the Old Town district had become Chicago's first gay village.

On December 10, 1924, the state issued a charter to a nonprofit corporation called the Society for Human Rights, established in Old Town. It became the first openly homophile advocacy group in the United States, and had, through its founder and World War I army veteran Henry Gerber, taken its inspiration from the writings of German activist and physician Magnus Hirschfeld. It was effectively dissolved within a few months of its establishment after the small group of members are arrested on obscenity charges. It became an indirect inspiration for then-Los Angeles resident Harry Hay, who heard of the group from a partner of one of the Society's members and would later establish in 1950 the first enduring homophile organization, the Mattachine Society.

1950–1968
In 1961, Illinois became the first state in the union to decriminalize consensual sodomy. This was in accordance with the American Law Institute's Model Penal Code, which abrogated the criminalization of adult, consensual, private, sexual conduct. However, "lewd fondling or caress" between persons of the same sex in public space remained illegal until 1984.

In 1965, Mattachine Midwest, the Chicago chapter of the Mattachine Society, was established. Prior chapters of the Society had been disbanded prematurely in the 1950s and 1960s. Among the members of the chapter are Pearl M. Hart and Valerie Taylor.

1969–1999
In 1970, the Bijou Theater was opened in Chicago's Old Town neighborhood, and Chicago Pride Parade was first held.

In 1973, Gay Horizons opened up as Chicago's first LGBT community center, changing its name to Horizons Community Services in 1985.

In 1976, Gay Chicago Magazine was founded in by Ralph Paul Gernhardt.

In 1981, the Gerber/Hart Library was opened.

In 1991, the Chicago Gay and Lesbian Hall of Fame was established.

In 1997, Larry McKeon became the first openly gay member of the Illinois State Legislature.

21st century

2000s
In 2003, Horizons Community Center renamed itself as the Center on Halsted. In 2007, it moved into its permanent location at the corner of Halsted and Waveland in Boystown, Chicago.

In 2006, the 2006 Gay Games were held in Chicago from July 15–July 22.

2010–present
Governor Pat Quinn signed legislation introducing civil unions to Illinois. It took effect on June 1, 2014.

References

LGBT history in Illinois